The world egg, cosmic egg or mundane egg is a mythological motif found in the cosmogonies of many cultures that is present in Proto-Indo-European culture and other cultures and civilizations. Typically, the world egg is a beginning of some sort, and the universe or some primordial being comes into existence by "hatching" from the egg, sometimes lain on the primordial waters of the Earth.

Eggs symbolize the unification of two complementary principles (represented by the egg white and the yolk) from which life or existence, in its most fundamental philosophical sense, emerges.

Formosan Mythology 
While just two of Taiwan's 16 officially recognized aboriginal tribes have deluge myths that incorporate the theme of Origin of Ancestors from Eggs, three tribes, the Paiwan, Puyuma and Rukai have primary anthropogenic myths which include the motif of cosmic eggs which give birth to the protoplasts.

Vedic mythology 

The earliest idea of the "cosmic egg" comes from some of the Sanskrit scriptures. The Sanskrit term for it is Brahmanda (ब्रह्माण्ड) which is derived from two words – 'Brahma' (ब्रह्मा) the 'creator god' in Hinduism and 'anda' (अण्ड) meaning 'egg'. Certain Puranas such as the Brahmanda Purana speak of this in detail.

The Rig Veda (RV 10.121) uses a similar name for the source of the universe: Hiranyagarbha (हिरण्यगर्भ) which literally means "golden fetus" or "golden womb" and is associated with the universal source Brahman where the whole of all existence is believed to be supported. The Upanishads elaborate that the Hiranyagarbha floated around in emptiness for a while, and then broke into two halves which formed Dyaus (the Heavens) and Prithvi (Earth). The Rig Veda has a similar coded description of the division of the universe in its early stages.

Zoroastrian mythology 
According to Zoroastrian cosmology, the period of (material) creation, also to last 3,000 years, began after the treaty, when Ohrmazd recited the Ahunwar (Av. Ahuna Vairiia) prayer, revealing to Ahriman his ultimate defeat and causing him to fall back into the darkness in a stupor, which lasted for the entire period of the creation.  During this time Ohrmazd fashioned his creations in material (gētīg) form, by celebrating a “spiritual yasna”.  He placed each creation under the protection of one of the seven Amahraspands (Av. Aməša Spənta).  First he created the sky (protected by Šahrewar, Av. Xšaθra Vairiia), which enclosed the world like the shell of an egg.  The second creation was water (protected by Hordād, Av. Haurvatāt), which filled the lower half of the “egg.”  The third creation, earth (protected by Spandārmad, Av. Spənta Ārmaiti), shaped like a flat disk, floated on the primeval waters.  On it stood the fourth, fifth, and sixth creations, respectively the single plant or tree (protected by Amurdād;  Av. Amərətāt), the uniquely created bull (protected by Wahman, Av. Vohu Manah), and the first man, Gayōmard (Av. Gaiiō.marətan, protected by Ohrmazd himself).  The seventh creation, fire (protected by Ardwahišt;  Av. Aṧa Vahišta), was said to have permeated all other creations. During the 3,000 years of the period of material creation these creations were motionless, and the sun stood still in the middle of the sky.

Yazidism 
The Yazidi qewls mention the universe as having originated from a white pearl that existed in pre-eternity. At the beginning of the time prior to the creation, God emerged from the cosmic pearl, which rested on the horns of a bull that stood on the back of a fish. After God and the pearl separated, the universe burst out of the pearl and became visible as waves rippled across from pearl to form the primeval Cosmic Ocean. As the pearl burst open, the beginning of the material universe was set in motion. Mihbet (meaning 'love') came into being and was laid as the original foundation, colours began to form, and red, yellow and white began to shine from the burst pearl.

Mandaeism 

Mandaean creation accounts often mention the universe as having originated from a primal "fruit" (pira) or sometimes "egg" (hilbuna). According to Book 3 of the Right Ginza, one of the Mandaean scriptures, the universe originated from a "fruit (pira) within a fruit." In the Right Ginza, egg whites are described as hidden heavenly "mansions," or shkinta (i.e., shekhinah).

Greek/Orphic mythology 

The Orphic Egg in the ancient Greek Orphic tradition is the cosmic egg from which hatched the primordial hermaphroditic deity Phanes/Protogonus (variously equated also with Zeus, Pan, Metis, Eros, Erikepaios and Bromius) who in turn created the other gods. The egg is often depicted with a serpent wound around it.

Many threads of earlier myths are apparent in the new tradition. Phanes was believed to have been hatched from the World egg of Chronos (Time) and Ananke (Necessity) or Nyx (Night). His older wife Nyx called him Protogenus. As she created nighttime, he created daytime. He also created the method of creation by mingling. He was made the ruler of the deities and passed the sceptre to Nyx. This new Orphic tradition states that Nyx later gave the sceptre to her son Uranos before it passed to Cronus and then to Zeus, who retained it.

Egyptian mythology 
The ancient Egyptians accepted multiple creation myths as valid, including those of the Hermopolitan, Heliopolitan, and Memphite theologies. Under the Hermopolitan theology, there is the Ogdoad, which represents the conditions before the gods were created (Van Dijk, 1995).
An aspect within the Ogdoad is the Cosmic Egg, from which all things are born. Life comes from the Cosmic Egg; the sun god Ra was born from the primordial egg in a stage known as the first occasion (Dunand, 2004).

Phoenician mythology 

A philosophical creation story traced to "the cosmogony of Taautus, whom Philo of Byblos explicitly identified with the Egyptian Thoth—"the first who thought of the invention of letters, and began the writing of records"— which begins with Erebus and Wind, between which Eros 'Desire' came to be. From this was produced Môt which seems to be the Phoenician/Ge'ez/Hebrew/Arabic/Ancient Egyptian word for 'Death' but which the account says may mean 'mud'. In a mixed confusion, the germs of life appear, and intelligent animals called Zophasemin (explained probably correctly as 'observers of heaven') formed together as an egg, perhaps. The account is not clear. Then Môt burst forth into light and the heavens were created and the various elements found their stations.

Following the etymological line of Jacob Bryant one might also consider with regard to the meaning of Môt, that according to the Ancient Egyptians Ma'at was the personification of the fundamental order of the universe, without which all of creation would perish. She was also considered the wife of Thoth.

Chinese mythology 

In the myth of Pangu, developed by Taoist monks hundreds of years after Lao Zi, the universe began as an egg that symbolizes the primordial state of Taiji.  A primeval hermaphroditic giant named Pangu, born inside the egg, broke it into two halves: the upper half became the sky, while the lower half became the earth.  As the god grew taller, the sky and the earth grew thicker and were separated further.  Finally Pangu died and his body parts became the sun, moon, different parts of the earth and living things.

Finnish mythology 

In the Kalevala, the Finnish national epic, there is a myth of the world being created from the fragments of an egg laid by a goldeneye on the knee of Ilmatar, goddess of the air:

 One egg's lower half transformed
 And became the earth below,
 And its upper half transmuted
 And became the sky above;
 From the yolk the sun was made,
 Light of day to shine upon us;
 From the white the moon was formed,
 Light of night to gleam above us;
 All the colored brighter bits
 Rose to be the stars of heaven
 And the darker crumbs changed into
 Clouds and cloudlets in the sky.

In many original folk poems, the duck - or sometimes an eagle - laid its eggs on the knee of Väinämöinen.

Polynesian mythology 
In Cook Islands mythology, deep within Avaiki (the Underworld), a place described as resembling a vast hollow coconut shell, there dwelt in the deepest depths, the primordial mother goddess, Varima-te-takere. Her domain was described as being so narrow, that her knees touched her chin. It was from this place that she created the first man, Avatea, a god of light, a hybrid being half man and half fish. He was sent to the Upperworld to shine light in the land of men, and his eyes were believed to be the sun and the moon.

In Samoan and Tahitian mythology, all existence began inside an egg-like shell called Rumia. The first being to exist within Rumia was Tangaloa. Tangaloa instigated the creation of many aspects of reality, the atea/lagi heavens, the papa earth, and additional living creatures (the atua / gods) tightly compressed within the shell. The new creatures eventually worked to release the shell and pushed the heavens and earth apart, resulting in the universe as we know it.

Dogon mythology 
In Dogon mythology (West Africa):
"In the beginning, Amma dogon, alone, was in the shape of an egg: the four collar bones were fused, dividing the egg into air, earth, fire, and water, establishing also the four cardinal directions. Within this cosmic egg was the material and the structure of the universe, and the 266 signs that embraced the essence of all things. The first creation of the world by Amma was, however, a failure. The second creation began when Amma planted a seed within herself, a seed that resulted in the shape of man. But in the process of its gestation, there was a flaw, meaning that the universe would now have within it the possibilities for incompleteness. Now the egg became two placentas, each containing a set of twins, male and female. After sixty years, one of the males, Ogo, broke out of the placenta and attempted to create his own universe, in opposition to that being created by Amma. But he was unable to say the words that would bring such a universe into being. He then descended, as Amma transformed into the earth the fragment of placenta that went with Ogo into the void. Ogo interfered with the creative potential of the earth by having incestuous relations with it. His counterpart, Nommo, a participant in the revolt, was then killed by Amma, the parts of his body cast in all directions, bringing a sense of order to the world. When, five days later, Amma brought the pieces of Nommo's body together, restoring him to life, Nommo became ruler of the universe. He created four spirits, the ancestors of the Dogon people; Amma sent Nommo and the spirits to earth in an ark, and so the earth was restored. Along the way, Nommo uttered the words of Amma, and the sacred words that create were made available to humans. In the meantime, Ogo was transformed by Amma into Yuguru, the Pale Fox, who would always be alone, always be incomplete, eternally in revolt, ever wandering the earth seeking his female soul. "

Representations 
 In the temple of Daiboth (probably Daibod) at Meaco (now Kyoto) in Japan, the egg is described as floating in an expanse of water, which opened with the assistance of the sacred steer (bull), upon which the world issued forth to this day.

Modern mythology 
In 1955 poet and writer Robert Graves published the mythography The Greek Myths, a compendium of Greek mythology normally published in two volumes. Within this work Graves' imaginatively reconstructed "Pelasgian creation myth" features a supreme creatrix, Eurynome, "The Goddess of All Things", who arose naked from Chaos to part sea from sky so that she could dance upon the waves. Catching the north wind at her back and, rubbing it between her hands, she warms the pneuma and spontaneously generates the serpent Ophion, who mates with her. In the form of a dove upon the waves, she lays the Cosmic Egg and bids Ophion to incubate it by coiling seven times around until it splits in two and hatches "all things that exist... sun, moon, planets, stars, the earth with its mountains and rivers, its trees, herbs, and living creatures".

In modern cosmology 
The concept was figuratively re-adopted by modern science in the 1930s and explored by theoreticians during the following two decades. Current cosmological models maintain that 13.8 billion years ago, the entire mass of the universe was compressed into a gravitational singularity, a so-called ‘cosmic egg’ from which it 'hatched', expanding to its current state following the Big Bang.

The idea of a scientific cosmic egg comes from a need to describe the consequences of Vesto Slipher's observation and Edwin Hubble's confirmation of an expanding universe; extrapolated backwards in time, it implies a finite starting-time and a small starting-place, from which the entire cosmos metaphorically hatched. The expansion contradicts the then-established conception of the universe as eternally old, with no start and no growth: Einstein's static universe.

 In 1913, Vesto Slipher published his observations that light from remote galaxies was redshifted, which was gradually accepted as meaning that all galaxies (except Andromeda) receding from the Earth.

 Alexander Friedmann predicted the same consequence in 1922 from Einstein's equations of general relativity, once the previous ad-hoc cosmological constant was removed from it (which had been inserted to conform to the preconceived eternal, static universe).
 Georges Lemaître proposed in 1927 that the cosmos originated from what he called the primeval atom.
 Edwin Hubble observationally confirmed Lemaître's findings two years later, in 1929.

 In the late 1940s, George Gamow's assistant cosmological researcher Ralph Alpher, proposed the name ylem for the primordial substance that existed between the Big Crunch of the previous universe and the Big Bang of our own universe. Ylem is closely related to the concept of supersymmetry.

See also 

 Brahma
 Brahman
 Brahmanda
 Hiranyagarbha
 Orphic egg
 Phanes

References

Sources

External links 
 Creation

Creation myths
Eggs in culture

pl:Jajko w kulturze#Symbolika